Leipzig-Gohlis is a railway station located in Gohlis, a borough of Leipzig, Germany. The station is located on the Leipzig-Wahren–Leipzig Hbf and Leipzig–Großkorbetha railways. Passenger services are operated by DB Regio. Since December 2013 the station is served by the S-Bahn Mitteldeutschland.

Train services
S-Bahn Mitteldeutschland services currently call at the station.

References

External links

Gohlis
Leipzig Gohlis